The Lake Boga Football Netball Club, nicknamed the Magpies, is an Australian rules football and netball club based in the town of Lake Boga, Victoria.

History
Lake Boga is a small town 14 km south of Swan Hill. The township was declared in 1892, the same year the football team was formed. 

Lake Boga played its first match in May 1892, at home against one of the Swan Hill townships sides, the “Faugh-a-Ballaghs” .
From its inception Lake Boga competed in small football competitions that occurred in the district that often had two teams residing in Swan Hill. The name of these competitions changed frequently until 1933 when the Northern District FL was founded in which Lake Boga was a founding member. That competition ceased because of the WW II.
When football resumed after the war the local competition was the Mid Murray FL. 

When in 1997 the Mid Murray FL merged with the Northern & Echuca FL it became the Central Murray Football League, which the club is founding member.

Premierships
 Swan Hill FA
 1899, 1905, 1906, 1916, 1923, 1927,
 Northern Districts FL
 1940
 Mid Murray FL
 1951, 1953, 1954, 1967, 1975
 Central Murray FL
 2003

VFL/AFL  players

 Dick O'Bree -

Bibliography

 In Full Flight, the Magpie's Story: A Centenary History of Lake Boga Football Club 1892-1992 by Graeme Gardner, 1992,

References

Further reading
 Lake Boga Football Club Information

Central Murray Football League
1892 establishments in Australia
Sports clubs established in 1892
Australian rules football clubs established in 1892
Australian rules football clubs in Victoria (Australia)
Netball teams in Victoria (Australia)